Kallenbach is a German surname. Notable people with the surname include:

Gisela Kallenbach (born 1944), German MEP
Hermann Kallenbach, South African architect and close friend of Gandhi
Józef Kallenbach (1861–1929), Polish literature historian
Kenneth Keith Kallenbach, American comedian
Manfred Kallenbach (1942-2010), German goalkeeper 

German-language surnames